Bobbi Ann Brady is a Canadian politician who was elected to the Legislative Assembly of Ontario in the 2022 provincial election. She represents Haldimand—Norfolk as an Independent.

Prior to her election to the legislature, Brady worked as executive assistant to her predecessor, Progressive Conservative Party of Ontario MPP Toby Barrett. When Barrett announced his retirement, Brady planned to run for the nomination to replace him as the PC candidate, but after the party's central office directly appointed Haldimand County mayor Ken Hewitt as its new candidate without consulting the local electoral district association, Brady opted to run against Hewitt as an independent, with Barrett's endorsement and participation in her campaign.

References 

Living people
21st-century Canadian politicians
21st-century Canadian women politicians
Independent MPPs in Ontario
Women MPPs in Ontario
Year of birth missing (living people)